The Social Christian Republican Party is a Costa Rican political party founded in 2014 by former president Rafael Ángel Calderón Fournier and his group of supporters as a splinter from the historical Social Christian Unity Party (PUSC). The party also uses the colors and a similar name of Calderón's father's party, the National Republican Party.

The Party was created soon after the Calderonistas left PUSC due to unusually harsh clashes among the Calderonista and Liberal factions inside the party during the general election of 2014. Both factions have been historically rivals but generally work together after the primaries, but after the 2013 presidential primary in which the Calderonista candidate Dr. Rodolfo Hernández won, internal fighting between Hernández and the Liberal-led National Committee caused Hernández's resignation.

Hernández and Calderón founded the PRSC a few months after the election, and its first election was in the 2016 municipal elections, with the party electing one mayor, one intendant and several aldermen and syndics. Its candidate for the 2018 Costa Rican general election, is Hernández.

Electoral performance

Presidential

Parliamentary

References

Christian democratic parties in North America
Political parties in Costa Rica
Political parties established in 2014